Mohamed Tawal Camara (born 23 May 1976) is a Guinean former footballer who played in Hungary for Újpest. He was capped three times by Guinea in 1996.

Career statistics

Club

Notes

International

References

1976 births
Living people
Sportspeople from Conakry
Guinean footballers
Guinea international footballers
Association football defenders
Nemzeti Bajnokság I players
Újpest FC players
Guinean expatriate footballers
Guinean expatriate sportspeople in Hungary
Expatriate footballers in Hungary